Robert "Bobby" Windsor (31 January 1926 – 2000) was an English footballer who played in the Football League for Lincoln City.

Career
Windsor was born in Stoke-on-Trent and joined Stoke City during World War II. He made two appearances for Stoke in 1943–44 and in 1944–45. He made three appearances in 1945–46 and with the war coming to an end Windsor had the opportunity to being to push for a first team place. But he was nowhere near good enough and played for the reserves for two seasons before joining Lincoln City. He played two seasons for Lincoln playing 11 times scoring once against Sheffield Wednesday. He ended his career with non-league Wellington Town.

Career statistics

References

1926 births
2000 deaths
English footballers
Stoke City F.C. players
Lincoln City F.C. players
English Football League players
Telford United F.C. players
Association football forwards
Footballers from Stoke-on-Trent